Harvest is the process of gathering mature crops from the fields.

Harvest may also refer to:

Agriculture
Harvest (wine), the harvesting of wine grapes
Harvest festival, an annual celebration occurring around the time of the harvest

Cities
Harvest, Alabama

Entertainment and media

Film
Harvest (1936 film), an Austrian film
Harvest (1937 film), a French film
Harvest (1967 film), a 1967 documentary film
The Harvest (1993 film), a thriller directed by David Marconi
The Harvest (soundtrack), the 1993 film's soundtrack
The Harvest (2010 film), a 2010 feature documentary film about children migrant workers
The Harvest (2013 film), a horror-thriller film by John McNaughton

Literature
Harvest (Crace novel), a novel by Jim Crace nominated for the 2013 Man Booker Prize
Harvest: Contemporary Mormon Poems (1989)
Harvest, a 1996 medical thriller novel by Tess Gerritsen
Harvest, a 1995 novel by New Zealand author Ian Middleton
Harvest, a 1990 novel by Belva Plain
Harvest, a 1920 novel by Mary Augusta Ward
The Harvest (Wilson novel), by author Robert Charles Wilson
Harvest (Neopagan magazine), published from 1980 to 1992
Second Harvest (novel), a 1930 novel by Jean Giono first published in English as Harvest

Music
Harvest (band), a Christian band active from 1977 to 1995
Harvest Records, a Progressive rock record label owned by EMI

Albums

Harvest (Dragon Ash album), 2003
Harvest (Neil Young album), 1972
Harvest (Richard Davis album)
Harvest (Shizuka Kudo album), 1989
Harvest (Tokio album), 2006
Harvest, a 2007 album by Naglfar
The Harvest (Alove for Enemies album), 2005
The Harvest (Boondox album), 2006
The Harvest (Tribal Seeds album), 2009
The Harvest, album by Qwel & Maker, 2004

Songs
"Harvest" (Neil Young song), 1972 title track from the album of the same name
"Harvest", from the 2001 album Blackwater Park by Opeth
"Harvest", from the 1997 album In This Room by the 3rd and the Mortal
"Harvest: Concerto for Trombone", a concerto by American John Mackey (composer)

Television
"The Harvest" (Buffy the Vampire Slayer), a 1997 episode of the television series Buffy the Vampire Slayer
"Harvest" (CSI), a 2004 episode of the television series CSI: Crime Scene Investigation
"Harvest" (Numbers), a 2006 episode of the television series Numbers
"Harvest" (The Americans), a 2018 episode of the television series The Americans

Video games
The Harvest, a 2010 video game by Luma Arcade and published by Microsoft Games Studios
Harvest: Massive Encounter, a 2008 indie video game by Oxeye Game Studio

Other
Harvest (play), by Manjula Padmanabhan
Harvest, a painting by Vincent van Gogh; see Wheat Fields (Van Gogh series)
The Harvest (Charles-Francois Daubigny), an 1851 painting by Charles-François Daubigny
The Harvest (audio drama), a 2004 Big Finish Productions audio drama based on the television series Doctor Who

Science and technology
Harvest project, a web cache research project
Harvest (software), time tracking and invoicing software
CA Harvest Software Change Manager, originally named CCC/Harvest, a CA software product
Email-address harvesting, obtaining lists of e-mail addresses for purposes usually grouped as spam
Energy harvesting, the use of captured ambient energy to power small devices
IBM 7950 Harvest, a one-of-a-kind adjunct to the Stretch computer
Organ procurement, also referred to as "organ harvesting", the collection of viable organs from dead or dying donors for organ transplantation
Web scraping, also referred to as "web harvesting", a focused form of a web crawler search

Organizations
Harvest Crusades
Harvest Christian Fellowship

See also
Harvester (disambiguation)